These are Wikipedia lists about the pharmaceutical industry. The pharmaceutical industry develops, produces, and markets drugs or pharmaceuticals licensed for use as medications. Pharmaceutical companies are allowed to deal in generic or brand medications and medical devices. They are subject to a variety of laws and regulations regarding the production, testing, and marketing of drugs.

List of pharmaceutical companies
List of largest selling pharmaceutical products
List of largest pharmaceutical settlements
List of off-label promotion pharmaceutical settlements
List of pharmaceutical sciences journals
List of pharmaceutical compound number prefixes  
List of pharmaceutical manufacturers in the United Kingdom
List of pharmaceutical companies in Hyderabad
List of pharmaceutical companies in China
List of GlaxoSmithKline products

See also

 

 

Drug-related lists
Medical lists
Industry-related lists